Williams Land District is a land district (cadastral division) of Western Australia, located within the South West Division.

Notes

Land districts of Western Australia